Mohammadabad-e Gar Gar (also Romanized as Moḩammadābād-e Gar Gar and Moḩammadābād-e Kar Kar; also known as Moḩammadābād) is a village in Ebrahimabad Rural District, Ramand District, Buin Zahra County, Qazvin Province, Iran. At the 2006 census, its population was 80, in 20 families.

References 

Populated places in Buin Zahra County